In mathematics, systolic inequalities for curves on surfaces were first studied by Charles Loewner in 1949 (unpublished; see remark at end of P. M. Pu's paper in '52). Given a closed surface, its systole, denoted sys, is defined to be the least length of a loop that cannot be contracted to a point on the surface.  The systolic area of a metric is defined to be the ratio area/sys2.  The systolic ratio SR is the reciprocal quantity sys2/area.  See also Introduction to systolic geometry.

Torus

Real projective plane
A similar result is given by Pu's inequality for the real projective plane from 1952, due to Pao Ming Pu, with an upper bound of π/2 for the systolic ratio SR(RP2), also attained in the constant curvature case.

Klein bottle

based on work by Blatter from the 1960s.

Genus 2
An orientable surface of genus 2 satisfies Loewner's bound , see (Katz-Sabourau '06).  It is unknown whether or not every surface of positive genus satisfies Loewner's bound.  It is conjectured that they all do.  The answer is affirmative for genus 20 and above by (Katz-Sabourau '05).

Arbitrary genus
For a closed surface of genus g, Hebda and Burago (1980) showed that the systolic ratio SR(g) is bounded above by the constant 2.  Three years later, Mikhail Gromov found an upper bound for SR(g) given by a constant times

A similar lower bound (with a smaller constant) was obtained by Buser and Sarnak.  Namely, they exhibited arithmetic hyperbolic Riemann surfaces with systole behaving as a constant times .  Note that area is 4π(g-1) from the Gauss-Bonnet theorem, so that SR(g) behaves asymptotically as a constant times .

The study of the asymptotic behavior for large genus  of the systole of hyperbolic surfaces reveals some interesting constants.  Thus, Hurwitz surfaces  defined by a tower of principal congruence subgroups of the (2,3,7) hyperbolic triangle group satisfy the bound

resulting from an analysis of the Hurwitz quaternion order. A similar bound holds for more general arithmetic Fuchsian groups. For the Hurwitz surfaces of principal congruence type, the systolic ratio SR(g) is asymptotic to

Using Katok's entropy inequality, the following asymptotic upper bound for SR(g) was found in (Katz-Sabourau 2005):

see also (Katz 2007), p. 85.  Combining the two estimates, one obtains tight bounds for the asymptotic behavior of the systolic ratio of surfaces.

Sphere
There is also a version of the inequality for metrics on the sphere, for the invariant L defined as the least length of a closed geodesic of the metric. A lower bound of 1/961 obtained by Croke in '88 has recently been improved by Nabutovsky, Rotman, and Sabourau.

See also
Differential geometry of surfaces

References

Differential geometry of surfaces
Systolic geometry